Stridens hus is the sixth full-length album from Norwegian black metal band Taake. It was released on 8 December 2014.

Track listing
All lyrics and music by Hoest.
"Gamle Norig" - 5:54
"Orm" - 6:43
"Det fins en prins " - 8:07 
"Stank" - 6:20
"En sang til sand om ildebrann" - 5:06
"Kongsgaard bestaar" - 5:35
"Vinger" - 5:49

Personnel

Taake
Hoest – vocals, all other instruments

Additional personnel
 Herbrand Larsen – mastering
 Bjoernar E. Nilsen – producer, recording, mixing
 Nekrographie – artwork, photography

Taake albums
2014 albums
Dark Essence Records albums